Calmodulin 2 is a protein that in humans is encoded by the CALM2 gene.

Clinical significance 

Mutations in CALM2 are associated to cardiac arrhythmias.

Interactions 

CALM2 has been shown to interact with AKAP9.

See also 
 calmodulin

References

External links

Further reading 

 
 
 
 
 
 
 
 
 
 
 
 
 
 
 
 
 
 

EF-hand-containing proteins